Rubbermaid Commercial Products, headquartered in Winchester, Virginia, is a manufacturer of commercial and institutional products. Since its founding in 1968, RCP has manufactured products in the categories of food services, sanitary maintenance, waste handling, material transport, away-from-home washroom, and safety products. RCP is part of Newell Brands.

Acquisitions 
In 2007, Rubbermaid Commercial Products acquired the assets of United Metal Receptacle Corporation, a manufacturer of decorative waste management and smoking management products and accessories for commercial facilities.

In 2008, Newell Rubbermaid acquired Technical Concepts Holdings, LLC, ("Technical Concepts") a global manufacturer of restroom hygiene systems. Technical Concepts’ products included touch-free and automated health, wellness and odor control solutions, as well as proprietary refills.

References

Winchester, Virginia
Companies based in Virginia